The 2019–20 Columbus Blue Jackets season was the 20th season for the National Hockey League franchise that was established on June 25, 1997.

The season was suspended by the league officials on March 12, 2020, after several other professional and collegiate sports organizations followed suit as a result of the ongoing COVID-19 pandemic. On May 26, the NHL regular season was officially declared over with the remaining games being cancelled.

The Blue Jackets advanced to the playoffs and defeated the Toronto Maple Leafs in the qualifying round, but were defeated in the first round by the Tampa Bay Lightning in five games.

Standings

Divisional standings

Eastern Conference

Schedule and results

Preseason
The preseason schedule was published on June 18, 2019. The September 29 game between the Blue Jackets and the St. Louis Blues was cancelled due to issues with the team's flight.

Regular season
The regular season schedule was published on June 25, 2019.

Playoffs

The Blue Jackets defeated the Toronto Maple Leafs in the qualifying round in five games.

The Blue Jackets faced the Tampa Bay Lightning in the first round, and lost in five games.

Player statistics

Skaters

Goaltenders

†Denotes player spent time with another team before joining the Blue Jackets. Stats reflect time with the Blue Jackets only.
‡Denotes player was traded mid-season. Stats reflect time with the Blue Jackets only.
Bold/italics denotes franchise record.

References

Columbus Blue Jackets seasons
Columbus Blue Jackets
Blue
Blue